Augustana University is a private Lutheran university in Sioux Falls, South Dakota. The university identifies 1860 as the year of its founding, the same as its Rock Island, Illinois Swedish-heritage sister school, Augustana College. It derives its name from the Confessio Augustana, or Augsburg Confession, a foundational document of Lutheranism. Prior to September 2015, the university was known as Augustana College.

It is the largest private university in the state and offers Bachelor of Arts degrees in more than 50 major fields of study. Students also participate in a variety of extracurricular activities, including musical ensembles and NCAA athletic programs.

History
The institution traces its origin to 1835, when Scandinavian immigrants established the Hillsboro Academy in Hillsboro, Illinois. In 1846, the Academy became the Literary and Theological Institute of the Lutheran Church of the Far West before moving to Springfield, Illinois, under the name Illinois State University. In 1860, after church leaders formed the Scandinavian Evangelical Lutheran Augustana Synod, Professor Lars Paul Esbjörn and a group of followers moved to Chicago to create their own institution. There they established the Augustana College and Seminary, marking the date that the university identifies as the year of its founding.

As the United States expanded westward during and after the American Civil War, pioneers moved the school to Paxton, Illinois, in 1863. There, a split occurred: the Norwegian leadership, desiring to create their own school, relocated to Marshall, Wisconsin, in 1869, while the Swedes later moved to Rock Island, Illinois, establishing Augustana College (Illinois). The school at Marshall moved to Beloit, Iowa, in 1881, and then to Canton, South Dakota, in 1888.

The Lutheran Normal School opened in 1889 in Sioux Falls, South Dakota, housed in what is now known as Old Main, with the purpose of educating teachers. City and business leaders lobbied for Augustana to relocate to Sioux Falls, and church leaders in 1918 merged the Lutheran Normal School and Augustana College in Canton under the name Augustana College and Normal School. In 1926, "and Normal School" was dropped from the name and the site in Canton eventually became Augustana Academy. Despite the similarities in name, the Academy was no longer affiliated with the College and ultimately closed in 1971. The 2010–2011 academic year marked Augustana University's sesquicentennial.

Augustana draws its name from the origin of the Lutheran Church in the Augsburg Confession, written in 1530 during the Protestant Reformation. "Augustana" stems from the document's Latin name, Confessio Augustana. On August 21, 2015, the school announced that it would change its name from Augustana College and instead be known as Augustana University as of September 1, 2015.

Academics
Augustana University offers 53 majors, 34 minors, and 15 pre-professional programs. The top five most popular majors are nursing, biology, business administration, elementary education and psychology.

The university's curriculum is based on a calendar divided into two 15-week semesters, separated by an interim period of four weeks during January, as well as an optional summer term of eight weeks. Classes may be taken during the month of January. The school offers a 12:1 student-to-faculty ratio, and notable professors include L. Adrien Hannus and V.R Nelson.

Graduation requires completion of 124 total credit hours, 59 of which are general education courses, with a minimum cumulative grade point average of 2.0. "The Augustana Plan," the name of the 59 credit core curriculum, is "designed to develop articulate communicators, competent writers, creative thinkers, skilled problem solvers, and ethically minded, responsible citizens of the world." Extensive internship, study-abroad, undergraduate research and Civitas, the university's honors program, supplement the curriculum. Between 2007 and 2008, 285 students participated in an international educational experience, and 44% of students study abroad before graduation.

In 2017, U.S. News & World Report reported Augustana's financial endowment at $67.2 million. Donations have allowed the school to expand its academic facilities, such as the recent $7 million renovation of the Mikkelsen Library and the $45 million reconstruction of the Gilbert Science Complex, completed in 2015.

Admissions and rankings
, Augustana's student body consists of 1,825 undergraduates, 99% of whom are full-time students and 1% part-time, 59% were female. The acceptance rate stands at 61%. U.S. News & World Report classifies Augustana as a "more selective" school, with 62% of the students enrolled having graduated from high school in the top quartile of their class, the average GPA being 3.7. ACT test score submissions had a 23–28 middle 50% range, with an average ACT composite score of 26. Eight percent of incoming students in 2014 submitted SAT scores, with the middle 50% range for the mathematical and critical reading components being 500–650 and 510–580, respectively. The school's retention rate of freshmen returning as sophomores was 80% between 2013 and 2014.
 
Those enrolled are primarily from South Dakota (42%) and Minnesota (34%), followed by Iowa (12%) and Nebraska (4%). In the fall of the 2010–2011 academic year, Augustana reported its largest ever incoming class of international students. Fifty-four new students representing 20 countries and 5 continents joined 25 continuing international students for a total of 79 international students from 23 countries, making up about 4.5% of the student body. Although only 46% of students claim a preference for the school's Lutheran religious affiliation, the school is nevertheless composed primarily of students following another Christian denomination, Catholicism being the second largest at 21%; 22% of students, meanwhile, are categorized under "other."

In the 2015 U.S. News & World Report ranking of Midwestern colleges, Augustana placed third. The publication additionally named it a "Best Buy" school, the award based on academic quality in relation to attendance costs. The Princeton Review named Augustana as one of 159 "Best in the Midwest" schools in 2015. Forbes' list of "America's Top Colleges" placed Augustana at #97 among schools in the Midwest and #423 overall. Peterson's 440 Colleges for Top Students featured Augustana, and Harvard Schmarvard: Getting Beyond the Ivy League to the College That is Best for You listed the school as one of its "top 100 outstanding (but under-appreciated) colleges." The Templeton Guide selected Augustana as one of 100 select colleges and universities nationwide as part of its "Templeton Honor Roll." Zippia named Augustana University the top college in South Dakota - and No. 2 college in the nation - for getting a job in 2021.

Arts 

Augustana created the Center for Western Studies in 1970, founded by professor Herbert Krause, which serves as a library, repository for special collections of art and artifacts, and academic publisher. The center holds an annual Dakota Conference on the Northern Plains for history, literature, art, and archaeology. It is "the largest annual humanities conference specifically about the Northern Plains." In addition to shows and galleries of Western, Scandinavian, and Native American art, the Center also hosts the Boe Forum on Public Affairs, which has featured speakers such as Pervez Musharraf, Sandra Day O'Connor, and Mikhail Gorbachev.

The Augustana Choir and Concert Band tour widely nationally and internationally, including the People's Republic of China, Italy, and Tanzania. The band, while on tour in Egypt during the Revolution of 2011, found themselves briefly stranded in Cairo due to anti-government protests.

The Augustana College Theatre Company presents several main-stage shows each year, one of which is a musical, as well as several student produced shows by the Augustana College Theatrical Society. The department furthermore serves as home to the Claire Donaldson New Play Festival (previously called the 8-in-48 Claire Donaldson Short Play Festival), which occurs every other year.

In 2006, the new Center for Visual Arts replaced the old art department buildings, previously used as barracks during World War II. It holds artist and professor studios, studio classrooms for design, drawing, printmaking, painting, sculpture, ceramics, and an art education lab. In addition, the building houses the Eide-Dalrymple Gallery, which hosts several art exhibitions throughout the year.

Civitas 
Augustana's honors program, Civitas, was launched in 2007 and is currently directed by Sociology professor Wiiliam J. Swart. The program is named Civitas, a Latin word meaning "citizenship," and is built upon the work of Dietrich Bonhoeffer, a German Lutheran pastor and theologian who acted as a founding member of the Confessing Church and a participant in the German resistance movement against Nazism. Bonhoeffer's essay "The Structure of Responsible Life" serves as the central focus of the program. Emphasizing Stellvertretung (roughly translated as "vicarious representative action"), Bonhoeffer participated in the Abwehr plot to assassinate Hitler, and subsequently wrote the piece as a justification for his actions. Students examine his work in classes specifically designated for Civitas and in special honors sections of existing courses. 40 students are selected from each graduating class, of whom must maintain at minimum a 3.0 GPA, with entrance priority going to incoming students who possess an ACT score of at least 27 and a 3.5 cumulative high school GPA.

Natural sciences
An average of 90% of graduating seniors seeking admission into medical school have been accepted over the last three years, double the national acceptance rate, and the school claims a consistent 100% placement record of nursing graduates.

Construction began on the new Froiland Science Complex in August 2014, involving additions to and renovations of the existing Gilbert Science Center, and was completed in December 2015. The remodeled west wing of the building maintains the Gilbert name.

Athletics

The Augustana Vikings currently participate in NCAA Division II athletics in the Northern Sun Intercollegiate Conference. The Vikings joined the NSIC from the North Central Conference, which folded in 2008. The men's basketball team won the NCAA Division II national championship in 2016. The women's basketball team advanced to the NCAA Division II Final Four in 2013. The men's baseball team won the NCAA Division II national championship in 2018. During both the 2004–2005 and 2009–2010 school years, Augustana wrestlers finished second in the NCAA Division II championship. The Sioux Falls Arena serves at the home court for the men's and women's basketball team. The Elmen Center, opened in 1989, serves as the home court for the volleyball team and wrestling team.
On December 13, 2018, President Stephanie Herseth Sandlin announced that Augustana would begin pursuing a transition to Division I as part of the University's "Vision 2030" plan.

Media 
The college used to operate a radio station, 89.1 FM KAUR, which broadcast 24 hours per day. Up until 2009, KAUR broadcast a variety of genres of music and specialized in independent or college rock. KAUR was founded in 1972 and Augustana University also once managed a self-constructed AM station, which, itself, was founded in 1945. In the spring of 2009, administrators at Augustana University decided to discontinue KAUR's student operations in favor of broadcasting Minnesota Public Radio News.

Notable alumni

Linda Avey, co-founder, 23andme
Robert M. Berdahl, college and university administrator, former Chancellor of UC Berkeley
Jarret Brachman, terrorism expert, former director of research at West Point's Combating Terrorism Center
Phil Bruns, actor (Mary Hartman, Mary Hartman)
Nancy Erickson, Secretary of the United States Senate
Myron Floren, accordionist
Lars Forssell, Swedish writer and member of the Swedish Academy
C. J. Ham, professional football player
John Hamre, CEO of Center for Strategic and International Studies
Mary Hart (Harum), television host (Entertainment Tonight)
Dale Hoiberg, editor-in-chief of Encyclopædia Britannica
Ross Horning, historian
Les Josephson, professional football player
Kevin Kaesviharn, professional football player
Ted Kessinger, college football coach inducted into the College Football Hall of Fame
Corbin Lacina, professional football player
David Lillehaug, Associate Justice of Minnesota Supreme Court and United States Attorney for the District of Minnesota
Brent Loken, conservation scientist and social entrepreneur
Karl Mecklenburg, professional football player
Laurel Prieb, vice president of Western Operations for Major League Baseball
Heath Rylance, professional football player
Lee Schoenbeck, South Dakota Senate President Pro Tempore
Bryan Schwartz, professional football player
David Soul, actor (Starsky and Hutch)
Brett Szabo, professional basketball player
Fred Ward, actor (appeared in the films Tremors and others)
Troy Westwood, professional football player

References

External links

Augustana University official athletics website
 

 
Private universities and colleges in South Dakota
Educational institutions established in 1860
Education in Sioux Falls, South Dakota
Buildings and structures in Sioux Falls, South Dakota
1860 establishments in Illinois
1918 establishments in South Dakota